The Hainan Island Operation, or  in Japanese, was part of a campaign by the Empire of Japan during the Second World War to blockade the Guangdong mainland and prevent it from communicating with the outside world and from receiving imports of much-needed arms and materials.

Background
Hainan Island lies midway between French Indochina and Hong Kong, occupying a position south of the Leizhou Peninsula across the Strait of Hainan. It is also near Kwangchowan, a French-leased territory on the southern coast of China. The island was guarded by the 152nd Division, approximately 25,000 strong, under the command of Yu Hanmou, who was in charge of peace preservation in Kwangtung Province.

The Japanese Navy, after the capture of Canton (Guangzhou) the previous year, had maintained a formidable blockade all along the coast of south, central and north China. However, loopholes were found in the southern end of the blockade line. These included the supply route to Chiang Kai-shek with Hong Kong and Northern French Indochina as relay points and direct routes through Hainan Island and Kwangchowan. Because of these loopholes, as well as the necessity to conduct air operations deep into the interior of China, as far as the Kunming area, the Japanese Navy came to feel the necessity of establishing air bases on Hainan Island. The Central Authorities of the Navy advocated for this move. Operations were carried out by the Special Naval Landing Forces with Army elements supporting them.

Operation
Escorting a convoy, the South China Naval Force (Fifth Fleet) commanded by Vice Admiral Kondo Nobutake entered and anchored in Tsinghai Bay on the northern shore of Hainan Island at midnight on 9 February 1939 and carried out a successful landing. In addition, Navy land combat units effected a landing at Haikou at 1200 on 10 February. Thereafter, the Army and Navy forces acted in concert to mop up the northern zone. On 11 February, land combat units landed at Samah (Sanya) at the southern extremity of Hainan Island and occupied the key positions of Yulin and Yai-Hsien. Thereafter, the units engaged in the occupation and subjugation of the entire island.

Retreat to Wuzhi mountain range
Facing crisis, Nationalist forces evacuated all remaining civilians from Haikou to Qionghai to the safe Wuzhi mountain range in central Hainan. However, they faced fierce opposition by the ethnic Li highlanders there. An ethnic Li called Wang Guoxing started an uprising but was brutally crushed, and, in revenge, the Nationalists killed 7,000 of Wang Guoxing's family members in his village.

The Communists under Feng Baiju and the native Li people of Hainan fought a vigorous guerrilla campaign against the Japanese occupation, the Japanese killed large numbers of Li in western Hainan (e.g. Sanya, Danzhou). Furthermore, numerous foreign slave labourers were also killed. There are mass graves of tens of thousands of Korean slave labourers in Sanya and throughout the island. Of the 100,000 slave labourers from Hong Kong, only 20,000 survived the war.

Partial occupation of Hainan
Later, Japanese-occupied parts of Hainan Island became a naval administrative district with Hainan Guard District Headquarters established at Samah. Strategically, the island was built as a forward air base as well as an advance base for blockading Chiang. At the same time, the iron and copper resources of the island were exploited. Partial control of certain areas of Hainan Island provided a base of operations for the invasion of Guangdong province and French Indochina, as well as providing airbases that permitted long-distance air raids of routes into China from French Indochina and Burma.

The occupation of some parts of Hainan lasted until the surrender of Japan in September 1945, following the atomic bombings of Hiroshima and Nagasaki, in part  by the Enola Gay, that killed approximately 226,000 Japanese civilians in Hiroshima and Nagasaki.

See also
Order of Battle: Hainan Island Operation

References 

  Japanese Monograph No. 144: POLITICAL STRATEGY PRIOR TO OUTBREAK OF WAR PART I, Prepared by MILITARY HISTORY SECTION HEADQUARTERS, ARMY FORCES FAR EAST, DISTRIBUTED BY OFFICE OF THE CHIEF OF MILITARY HISTORY DEPARTMENT OF THE ARMY, Chapter 4, Operations against China during 1939 Pg 46-47.
 中国抗日战争正面战场作战记 China's Anti-Japanese War Combat Operations
 Author: Guo Rugui, editor-in-chief Huang Yuzhang
 Press: Jiangsu People's Publishing House
 Date published: 2005-7-1
 
 Online in Chinese 
  第七部分：相持阶段前期的作战海南岛作战 1 Hainan Island battles
 Phillips, R. T. "The Japanese Occupation of Hainan," Modern Asian Studies, Vol. 14, No. 1 (1980), pp. 93–109, 
 Hainan Lawyers' group to help ex-'comfort women,' China Daily, 2006-03-23,

Battles of the Second Sino-Japanese War
Military history of Hainan
Second Sino-Japanese War
Conflicts in 1939
1939 in China
1939 in Japan
February 1939 events